Qaleh Gachi (also Romanized as Qal‘eh Gachī) is a village in Rahmatabad Rural District, Zarqan District, Shiraz County, Fars Province, Iran. At the 2006 census, its population was 64, in 16 families.

References 

Populated places in Zarqan County